William F. Curtis Arboretum (84 acres), sometimes called Curtis Arboretum, is an arboretum located on the campus of Cedar Crest College in Allentown, Pennsylvania. The arboretum contains more than 140 varieties of trees, shrubs, and flowering bushes.

History
The arboretum began in 1915 when the college, at that time called the Allentown College for Women, moved to its current location from downtown Allentown. At the time, the campus was a cornfield with a single black walnut tree.  William F. Curtis, a minister and the college's seventh president, would not accept fees for speaking engagements, but instead welcomed donations of trees, shrubs, and flowering bushes for planting on campus.  The original black walnut tree was destroyed in a violent storm on August 11, 1983.  The campus was officially certified as an arboretum by the American Association of Botanical Gardens and Arboreta in 1985.

Collection
Acer palmatum
Betula pendula
Euonymus alatus
Ginkgo biloba
Platanus x hispanica
Prunus serrulata

Admission
The arboretum is open daily, and there is no fee for admission.

See also
List of botanical gardens and arboretums in the United States
 List of historic places in Allentown, Pennsylvania

References

External links 

 

Curtis Arboretum
Curtis Arboretum
Curtis Arboretum
Parks in Lehigh County, Pennsylvania
Tourist attractions in Allentown, Pennsylvania